Alloy steel is steel that is alloyed with a variety of elements in total amounts between 1.0% and 50% by weight to improve its mechanical properties.

Type of Alloy Steel 
Alloy steels are broken down into two groups: low alloy steels and high alloy steels. The difference between the two is disputed. Smith and Hashemi define the difference at 4.0%, while Degarmo, et al., define it at 8.0%. Most commonly, the phrase "alloy steel" refers to low-alloy steels. 

Strictly speaking, every steel is an alloy, but not all steels are called "alloy steels". The simplest steels are iron (Fe) alloyed with carbon (C) (about 0.1% to 1%, depending on type) and nothing else (excepting negligible traces via slight impurities); these are called carbon steels. However, the term "alloy steel" is the standard term referring to steels with other alloying elements added deliberately in addition to the carbon. Common alloyants include manganese (the most common one), nickel, chromium, molybdenum, vanadium, silicon, and boron. Less common alloyants include aluminium, cobalt, copper, cerium, niobium, titanium, tungsten, tin, zinc, lead, and zirconium.

Properties 
The following is a range of improved properties in alloy steels (as compared to carbon steels): strength, hardness, toughness, wear resistance, corrosion resistance, hardenability, and hot hardness. To achieve some of these improved properties the metal may require heat treating.

Although alloy steels have been made for centuries, their metallurgy was not well understood until the advancing chemical science of the nineteenth century revealed their compositions. Alloy steels from earlier times were expensive luxuries made on the model of "secret recipes" and forged into such tools as knives and swords. Modern alloy steels of the machine age were developed as improved tool steels and as newly available stainless steels. Today alloy steels find uses in a wide array of applications, from everyday hand tools and flatware to highly demanding applications such as in the turbine blades of jet engines and in nuclear reactors.

Because of the ferromagnetic properties of iron, some steel alloys find important applications where their responses to magnetism are very important, including in electric motors and in transformers.

Low-alloy steels

A few common low alloy steels are:

 D6AC
 300M
 256A

Material science
Alloying elements are added to achieve certain properties in the material. The alloying elements can change and personalize properties—their flexibility, strength, formability, and hardenability. As a guideline, alloying elements are added in lower percentages (less than 5%) to increase strength or hardenability, or in larger percentages (over 5%) to achieve special properties, such as corrosion resistance or extreme temperature stability. Manganese, silicon, or aluminium are added during the steelmaking process to remove dissolved oxygen, sulfur and phosphorus from the melt. Manganese, silicon, nickel, and copper are added to increase strength by forming solid solutions in ferrite. Chromium, vanadium, molybdenum, and tungsten increase strength by forming second-phase carbides. Nickel and copper improve corrosion resistance in small quantities. Molybdenum helps to resist embrittlement. Zirconium, cerium, and calcium increase toughness by controlling the shape of inclusions. Sulfur (in the form of manganese sulfide), lead, bismuth, selenium, and tellurium increase machinability. The alloying elements tend to form either solid solutions or compounds or carbides. Nickel is very soluble in ferrite; therefore, it forms compounds, usually Ni3Al. Aluminium dissolves in the ferrite and forms the compounds Al2O3 and AlN. Silicon is also very soluble and usually forms the compound SiO2•MxOy. Manganese mostly dissolves in ferrite forming the compounds MnS, MnO•SiO2, but will also form carbides in the form of (Fe,Mn)3C. Chromium forms partitions between the ferrite and carbide phases in steel, forming (Fe,Cr3)C, Cr7C3, and Cr23C6. The type of carbide that chromium forms depends on the amount of carbon and other types of alloying elements present. Tungsten and molybdenum form carbides if there is enough carbon and an absence of stronger carbide forming elements (i.e., titanium & niobium), they form the carbides W2C and Mo2C, respectively. Vanadium, titanium, and niobium are strong carbide forming elements, forming vanadium carbide, titanium carbide, and niobium carbide, respectively. Alloying elements also have an effect on the eutectoid temperature of the steel. Manganese and nickel lower the eutectoid temperature and are known as austenite stabilizing elements. With enough of these elements the austenitic structure may be obtained at room temperature. Carbide-forming elements raise the eutectoid temperature; these elements are known as ferrite stabilizing elements.

See also
HSLA steel
Microalloyed steel
SAE steel grades
Reynolds 531

References

Bibliography
.
Groover, M. P., 2007, p. 105-106, Fundamentals of Modern Manufacturing: Materials, Processes and Systems, 3rd ed, John Wiley & Sons, Inc., Hoboken, NJ, .

Steels